Johnny Test is an animated television series created by Scott Fellows, originally produced in the United States by Warner Bros. Animation and later produced in Canada by Cookie Jar Entertainment. It premiered on Kids' WB on September 17, 2005, which continued to air the series through its second and third seasons. The rest of the series aired on Cartoon Network starting on January 7, 2008, in the United States and internationally. In Canada, the show premiered on Teletoon on September 3, 2006.

The series revolves around the adventures of the title character, Johnny Test, an 11-year-old suburban boy who lives with his parents, his "super-genius" 13-year-old twin sisters, Susan and Mary, who are scientists and best friends with each other, and a talking dog named Dukey. They reside in the fictional town of Porkbelly in the United States. Johnny is often used as a test subject for his genius twin sisters' inventions and experiments, ranging from gadgets to superpowers. Their experiments often cause problems that he must resolve, and he must sometimes fight villains in the process. He occasionally saves the world with his sisters' inventions.

In 2013, Teletoon originally announced the renewal of a 13-episode seventh season and a three-part special, but it was unproduced after the show was cancelled. However, on May 6, 2020, WildBrain confirmed that a revival series has been picked up by Netflix for two seasons and a 66-minute interactive special, which released in 2021 with Fellows returning as showrunner and executive producer.

Plot
Eleven-year-old Johnny is part of the Test family, consisting of his 13-year-old genius twin sisters, Susan and Mary, and his over-the-top parents. His mother, "Lila," is a businesswoman, and his father, "Hugh" is an obsessive-compulsive househusband. Hugh's two biggest obsessions are cleaning and cooking meatloaf. The Test Twins frequently use Johnny as a guinea pig for their various experiments and inventions in their laboratory filled with highly advanced technology built over the Tests' household attic. Most of them involve trying to impress their pretty boy-next-door neighbor, Gil, for whom both harbor a deep love and obsession, although their attempts to come up with some way to attract his attention usually fail.

Johnny is a mischievous and unpredictable boy who causes many problems (often reaching within the city). His best friend is his anthropomorphic talking pet dog, Dukey, who Susan and Mary gave human-level intelligence and the ability to speak in an experiment. Because Johnny has Susan, Mary, and Dukey by his side, he can live any kid's dream, only to find that most dreams never turn out as hoped. Johnny is very hyperactive and often messes with his sisters' inventions, causing trouble and mayhem, but just as often proves himself to be clever, such as frequently tricking his sisters or saving the day from whatever danger happens to show up. He is also stubborn, and like many kids, he doesn't like school; if anything, he will often go to great lengths to avoid any work, often using his sisters' inventions to do so, resulting in himself and others in trouble.

One of Johnny's main nemeses is Eugene "Bling-Bling Boy" Hamilton, a fellow arch-rival of the Test sisters and frienemy of Johnny and Dukey, yet also has an unrequited crush on Susan. Another is Sissy Cutler, a tomboy who often serves as Johnny's rival/friend; the two may have crushes on each other, but both frequently deny and compete against each other. Missy, Sissy's pink labradoodle, is Dukey's rival/crush. A third is Bumper Randalls, the school bully who constantly picks on Johnny. Meanwhile, the General from the army base Area 51.1 and Mr. Black and Mr. White, two federal agents from the Super Secret Government Agency (SSGA), are shown to be close friends with the kids and often get them out of trouble or recruit them for an assignment, help them, distract, or annoy the Tests on various occasions.

Episodes

Characters

 Johnny Test (voiced by James Arnold Taylor)
 Dukey (voiced by Louis Chirillo (seasons 1–4); Trevor Devall (seasons 5–6))
 Susan Test (voiced by Maryke Hendrikse)
 Mary Test (voiced by Brittney Wilson (seasons 1 & 5); Ashleigh Ball (seasons 2–4 & 6)
 Hugh Test (voiced by Ian James Corlett)
 Lila Test (voiced by Kathleen Barr)
 Gil Nexdor (voiced by Andrew Francis)
 Mr. Black (voiced by Bill Mondy)
 Mr. White (voiced by Scott McNeil)

History

Origin and development
On February 16, 2005, Kids' WB's unveiling of its new fall schedule for the 2005–2006 television season was announced by The WB Television Network, featuring its returning series Yu-Gi-Oh!, Pokémon, The Batman, and Xiaolin Showdown, alongside four new series: Loonatics Unleashed, Coconut Fred's Fruit Salad Island, Transformers: Cybertron, and Johnny Test. The aforementioned schedule was announced by The WB/Kids' WB Entertainment President David Janollari, Kids' WB Senior Vice President and General Manager Betsy McGowen, speaking to advertisers and the media press during the Kids' WB upfront sales presentation in New York. Johnny Test was created and executively produced by Scott Fellows, who also created the Nickelodeon live-action series Ned's Declassified School Survival Guide, Big Time Rush, and 100 Things to Do Before High School; Fellows had also served as the head writer for The Fairly OddParents. The show premiered on September 17, 2005, on Kids' WB's Saturday morning lineup of its weekly fall schedule, alongside Loonatics Unleashed and Coconut Fred's Fruit Salad Island. The episode pair "Johnny to the Center of the Earth" and "Johnny X" marked the series premiere.

When the show first aired on Kids' WB, it performed very well in the Nielsen ratings. It ranked as the #1 broadcast program in Boys 2-11 (garnering 2.4/11), ranked as the #2 broadcast series in Kids 2-11 (gaining 2.2/10 in the process) and Girls 6-11 (2.3/11), and ultimately ranking #3 in Kids 6-11 (receiving 3.0/14). Its second season received a slightly higher number of viewers on average in the United States: 2.6 million viewers per 2nd-season episode. Its 3rd season's average number of viewers in the United States was 3.1 million viewers. Its 4th season got an average number of about 4.3 million viewers per episode in the United States. Its 5th premiere attracted over 4.7 million viewers in the United States.

The series was developed for television by Aaron Simpson, with a brief, slightly longer pre-existing pilot short produced by Simpson as well, before the show was picked up as a full series by Kids' WB. Based on Episode 1A "Johnny to the Center of the Earth", the pilot episode was animated roughly in Adobe Flash, but retaining the same plot, used the same color schemes as the aforementioned episode, and was recorded with an American voice cast (retaining James Arnold Taylor as the voice of Johnny Test) instead. The original production design (including character designs, prop designs, and background designs) was created, provided, and contributed by Matt Danner and Marc Perry, and then later worked on by producer Chris Savino and art director Paul Stec at season 1. Fellows, the creator of the series who had interested the network in the series' premise, based the titular character on himself when he was a young boy; he based Johnny's twin sisters, Susan and Mary, on his own two sisters, also named Susan and Mary. In the original pilot and early promotional material of the show, Dukey was referred to as "Poochie".

James Arnold Taylor said that he was not Fellows' original choice for the role of Johnny Test; he had previously voiced the lead character in the initial test pilot. After the show got picked up by Kids' WB! as a series, he was initially going to be replaced by a different voice actor, with a Canadian voice cast instead, but the studio had trouble finding Johnny's initial voice convincing for the first six episodes, so they gave Taylor back the role to redub his dialog for the rest of the first season and managed to keep him on the cast for the rest of the series. Aaron Simpson, who had developed the series and produced the pilot, was the creator and executive producer's first choice to serve as the producer of the show before he turned it down.

Production
The remainder of the first season was produced in-house by Warner Bros. Animation, but since the show was a U.S./Canada co-production, some of the animation production work was outsourced to Canadian animation studios Studio B Productions and Top Draw Animation, as well as South Korean animation production company Digital eMation, which also provided the original main title animation opening. Storyboarding of some of the episodes was done by Canadian animation studio Atomic Cartoons.

Many of the original crew of the series' first production season consisted of alumni of well-known animation studios such as Cartoon Network Studios and Nickelodeon Animation Studio, as well as artists from the comic book industry, including Chris Savino, Marc Perry, Paul Stec, Matt Danner, Joe Horne, Mike Kazaleh, Brian Larsen, Jun Falkenstein, Scott Shaw!, Nora Johnson, Milton Knight, Ray Leong, Chris Battle, Casey Mitchum, Pat Ventura, John Derevlany, J.C. Cheng, Aliki Theofilopoulos, George Cox III, Frederick J. Gardner III, Allan Penny, Justin Schultz, Christopher D. Lozinski, Dane Taylor, and Rita Cooper. The original version of the show's theme song and all of its underscores were both written, composed, and conducted by Kevin Manthei, with creator Scott Fellows having written and provided the lyrics to the theme song. Voice recording was provided by Voicebox Productions, with voice direction by Terry Klassen.

The merger of UPN and The WB into The CW Television Network had resulted in many budget cuts for the show, leading to the show being put on hiatus. Cookie Jar Entertainment, another Canada-based entertainment company, under their then-new action-adventure brand Coliseum, who previously had production assistance in the first season, decided to take control of the series' production. Due to this change, the writers, storyboarders, and art crew who worked on the first season were let go, resulting in an entirely new crew managing the show. Also, the budget of the show dropped dramatically, leading to seasons two and three of the show being animated in Adobe Flash by Collideascope Digital Productions. The show's opening theme was later changed for the rest of the series, with it being made of recycled episode footage. On March 1, 2008, the episode pair "Johnny X: A New Beginning" and "Johnny X: The Final Ending" aired. It was originally intended as the series finale; however, the series was renewed for a fourth season. Although Warner Bros. left the series' production, the credits still listed Warner Bros. as the trademark owner of Johnny Test so far until the last season.

The fourth season was animated at Atomic Cartoons with animation assistance from Seventoon Inc. and Philippine Animators Group Inc., which are both located in the Philippines. It finally premiered in high-definition on Teletoon on September 10, 2009, and on Cartoon Network in the U.S. on November 9, 2009. Later, on August 24, 2010, it was announced that the Johnny Test was renewed for a fifth season. As the fourth season before it, it would be a full set of 26 episodes with a 27th episode added to the end; the renewal brought the series total to 92 episodes. The fifth season premiered on Cartoon Network in America on June 13, 2011, along with a new theme sequence with the same song used from seasons 2–4. Starting with the fifth season, Trevor Devall would become the new voice of Dukey, due to Louis Chirillo leaving the series. Similarly, Ashleigh Ball retired as the voice of Mary, Sissy, and Missy at the end of the 4th season, due to her work on My Little Pony: Friendship Is Magic as the voice of Applejack and Rainbow Dash; as a result, she was replaced by Brittney Wilson, Mary's original voice.

On March 12, 2012, it was announced that the show had been renewed for a sixth season. Like the fourth and fifth season before it, it would again be a full set of 26 episodes; the renewal brought the series total to 117 episodes. Ashleigh Ball also returned for the roles in this season. The sixth season premiered on Cartoon Network in America on April 23, 2013. With this season, the show reached its 100th episode (and 200th segment), making it one of Teletoon's longest-running original series (Total Drama had produced 117 episodes and two specials, while Totally Spies! was co-produced between Seasons 3–5).

Revival

Web shorts 
On May 1, 2020, over a year after the announcement, the Johnny Test YouTube channel premiered the first episode of the web shorts "League of Johnnys" on May 2, 2020. Currently 15 episodes has been revealed.

TV series 

In May 2020, the show was picked up by Netflix for two additional seasons, along with an interactive special. The series has an updated look, provided by Stephen Silver, and was released on July 16, 2021.

Release

Broadcast history
Johnny Test premiered in the United States on September 17, 2005, on The WB's Saturday morning block, Kids' WB. One year later, it aired on Teletoon in Canada on September 8, 2006. During the second season, The WB and UPN merged into The CW, which aired the second and third seasons; the latter season premiered on September 22, 2007, and concluded on March 1, 2008. On January 7, 2008, the show debuted on Cartoon Network, which aired the remainder of the series, and ended on December 25, 2014.

DVD releases
NCircle Entertainment has released five DVDs. Johnny Test: Johnny & Dukey and Johnny vs. Bling Bling Boy were released on December 23, 2008. Johnny X and Super Pooch was released on August 11, 2009, Extreme Johnny was released on December 1, 2009, and Game Time was released on May 4, 2010.

On February 21, 2008, Liberation Entertainment released the complete first season on DVD in the UK, but as of 2012, no more seasons have been released in a Region 2 format.

On January 4, 2011, it was announced that Mill Creek Entertainment had acquired the rights to the series, under license from DHX Media. They have subsequently released the first four seasons on DVD in Region 1. The fifth season was released on May 5, 2015, and the first five seasons (with all discs from the separate season sets) were released on September 1, 2015.

Reception

Critical

Joly Herman of Common Sense Media had written and posted a review of Johnny Test on Go.com, at the time of the show's original debut on Kids' WB. In the review, Herman indicated that the series "is an age-appropriate choice for kids" and was "surprisingly inventive and not as violent as other cartoons in this genre", adding, "The only thing worth mentioning: All the experiments Johnny undergoes are unattended by adults, which allows all types of zany plots to unfold." Herman gave the show three stars out of five.

Awards and nominations
In 2006, the first season of the series was nominated for Outstanding Sound Editing - Live Action and Animation at the 33rd Daytime Emmy Awards and a Golden Reel Award for Best Sound Editing in Television Animation (for the episode pair, Deep Sea Johnny and Johnny and the Amazing Turbo Action Backpack) at Motion Picture Sound Editors, USA. In 2007, the second season of the show won a Gemini Award for Best Direction in a Children's or Youth Program or Series (for the episode pair, Saturday Night's Alright for Johnny and Johnny's Mint Chip) and in 2008, the third season was nominated for another Gemini Award, this time for Best Original Music Score for an Animated Program or Series (for the episode pair, Johnny vs. Bling-Bling 3 and Stinkin' Johnny); finally, in 2010, the show, in its fourth season, was nominated once more for yet another Gemini Award, this time wholly for Best Animated Program or Series (for the episode pair, Johnny Cakes and Johnny Tube) and had been awarded a Grand Prize for Best Program - All Categories at the Alliance for Children and Television's 2009 Gala award ceremony, which ultimately marks the series' owner, Cookie Jar's first ACT award.

In other media

Toys
Cookie Jar had partnered with restaurant chain CKE Restaurants to offer a promotional Johnny Test toy campaign at its Carl's Jr. and Hardee's restaurants in the U.S. and Mexico, one of the four custom-designed premiums with the purchase of their Cool Kids Combo meals; The campaign ran from June 28, 2010, through until August 24, 2010, with Carl's Jr. also having subsequently presented a Johnny Test soccer-themed promotion in Mexico, which lasted June 7 – July 25, 2010, to coincide with the country's World Cup activities. Philippines-based fried chicken chain Jollibee advertised a similar toy campaign in their Kids' Meals as well, in the form of their Amazing Adventure Chasers mini-toyline. In 2014, DHX Media signed a master toy license with Imports Dragon.

Video games

On January 21, 2010, another partnership had emerged between Cookie Jar Entertainment and the mobile application developer Jirbo that resulted in two Johnny Test video games produced by the developer and made available exclusively for download from iTunes, for free and for the iPhone, iPod Touch and iPad. The first game, Johnny Test: Clone Zapper, finds Johnny Test and Dukey engaged to combat an army of Johnny clones they accidentally created from a clone machine, with the help of two special laser zapper guns as their only weapons to defeat the clones and destroy them personally, and the second game, Johnny Test: Bot Drop, sees Johnny, Dukey and the Test twins going on a rescue chase, with Johnny and Dukey both piloting a bot drop plane to use the robot clones of Johnnies (first seen in 101 Johnnies) for the titular "Bot Drops" to eject them to safety in a moving rescue vehicle driven by Susan and Mary. In the plot of that latter aforementioned game, and like in each level of the game before it, Johnny has to aim and time to drop the robots, so they will land safely onto the vehicle, then Johnny Test has saved the day once again. Both games are typical shoot-slinging and side-scrolling games that in all utilize the iPhone, iPod Touch, and iPad's unique multitouch capabilities and scrolling, and, as a whole, players of both games can compete for worldwide high scores list of each level of the game and competitive players. Later in Spring of 2011, the series was finally officially licensed by Cookie Jar for a new third, and fully console-handled video game, this time, however, to come out on Nintendo DS; a sneak preview and trailer of the game had been already included on the complete first and second seasons DVD set and was released on March 29, 2011.

Comic books and graphic novels
Viper Comics announced in April 2011 that they would be publishing a Johnny Test graphic novel along with another Cookie Jar Group property, Inspector Gadget. The book was subsequently published with the title Johnny Test: The Once and Future Johnny.

Amusement park
The Granby Zoo in Granby, Quebec also has an amusement park called "Parc Johnny Test Collection."

References

External links

 Johnny Test at DHX Media
 Johnny Test official website
 Johnny Test at Teletoon
 
 Johnny Test at the Big Cartoon Database

 
2005 American television series debuts
2005 Canadian television series debuts
2014 American television series endings
2014 Canadian television series endings
2000s American animated television series
2010s American animated television series
2000s Canadian animated television series
2010s Canadian animated television series
American children's animated action television series
American children's animated adventure television series
American children's animated comic science fiction television series
American children's animated science fantasy television series
American flash animated television series
Animated television series about children
Canadian children's animated action television series
Canadian children's animated adventure television series
Canadian children's animated comic science fiction television series
Canadian children's animated science fantasy television series
Canadian flash animated television series
English-language television shows
The CW original programming
CW4Kids original programming
Kids' WB original shows
Cartoon Network original programming
Teletoon original programming
The WB original programming
Television series by Cookie Jar Entertainment
Television series by DHX Media
Television series by Warner Bros. Animation
Television series by Corus Entertainment
Television series created by Scott Fellows
American television series revived after cancellation
Canadian television series revived after cancellation
Television shows adapted into video games